Lumeje (or Cameia) is a municipality in Moxico Province, Angola. The seat of the municipality is Lumeje Kameia. It is notable for its national park. Lumeje and Lucano form the boundaries of the park. Cameia National Park was established as a game reserve in 1938 and proclaimed a national park in 1957. The municipality is the location site of two lakes, Lago Cameia and Lago Dilolo, the largest lake in Angola. It had a population of 29,476 in 2014.

References

External links
 Birdlife.com profile of Cameia National Park

Populated places in Moxico Province
Municipalities of Angola